Hoseyniyeh (also Romanized as Ḩoseynīyeh; also known as Bandar-e Ḩoseynīyeh) is a village in Moghuyeh Rural District, in the Central District of Bandar Lengeh County, Hormozgan Province, Iran. At the 2006 census, its population was 811, in 153 families.

References 

Populated places in Bandar Lengeh County